Palestine Command was a British military command in Mandatory Palestine and the Emirate of Transjordan.

History
The command was formed in February 1922 with the objective of controlling all British forces in Mandatory Palestine. In 1930, following an outbreak in hostilities between the Jewish and Arab populations, 2nd Battalion, South Staffordshire Regiment and the 1st Battalion, Northamptonshire Regiment were deployed to Palestine. In September 1936, following an escalation in violence, Lieutenant-General Sir John Dill was despatched there. After the Second World War, with the immigration of Jews, tensions increased further and 1st Infantry Division arrived in Palestine. In May 1948 the United Kingdom's mandate ended and British troops withdrew the following month.

Commanders
Commanders were as follows:
1936-1937 Lieutenant-General Sir John Dill
1937-1938 Lieutenant-General Archibald Wavell
1938-1939 Lieutenant-General Robert Haining
1939-1940 Lieutenant-General Michael Barker
1940-1940 Lieutenant-General George Giffard
1940-1941 Lieutenant-General Philip Neame
1941-1941 General Sir Henry Maitland Wilson
1941-1944 Major-General Douglas McConnel
1944-1946 Lieutenant-General John D'Arcy
1946-1947 Lieutenant-General Sir Evelyn Barker
1947-1948 Lieutenant-General Gordon MacMillan

See also

References

Commands of the British Army
Military history of Mandatory Palestine in World War II
1922 establishments in Mandatory Palestine